Crush is a four-issue comic book mini-series created in 2003 by Jason Hall (writer) and Sean Murphy (artist), and published by Dark Horse Comics.

Summary
Elizabeth Mason is a girl in a dysfunctional family who unwittingly changes into a monster named Crush whenever she bleeds. In her alternate form, Elizabeth seeks revenge against anyone who makes her daily life miserable. To make matters worse, the masked Mr. Vesper sends his minions to try to capture her. Along with her friends, Elizabeth makes an effort to figure out the mystery of her past and the identity of her true family.

Collected editions
A collection of all four issues was published on August 25, 2004.

References
Crush @ comicbookdb

2003 comics debuts
Comics by Sean Murphy
Dark Horse Comics limited series